Richard Peacock (born 29 October 1972) is an English former professional footballer who played as a midfielder.

He notably played in the Football League for Hull City, Lincoln City and Chester City. He also played Non-League football for Sheffield, Stalybridge Celtic, Worksop Town, Buxton and Lincoln United.

Career
Originally Peacock came from the non league game with his local club Sheffield F.C. Peacock made a step up to the professional game in 1993 where he signed for Hull City. As well as playing for The Tigers, he went on to feature as a professional for Lincoln City in The Football League, before playing in the Conference National for both Stalybridge Celtic and Chester City. He finished the last four years of his career back inside the depths of the non league. Firstly playing in the Northern Premier League with Worksop Town before sliding further down the divisions to feature for both Buxton and Lincoln United.

Personal life
Peacock now lives in Dronfield and has two sons.

References

External links

Living people
1972 births
Footballers from Sheffield
English footballers
Association football midfielders
Sheffield F.C. players
Hull City A.F.C. players
Lincoln City F.C. players
Stalybridge Celtic F.C. players
Chester City F.C. players
Worksop Town F.C. players
Buxton F.C. players
Lincoln United F.C. players
English Football League players
National League (English football) players